Land cover is the physical material at the surface of Earth. Land covers include grass, asphalt, trees, bare ground, water, etc. Earth cover is the expression used by ecologist Frederick Edward Clements that has its closest modern equivalent being vegetation. The expression continues to be used by the United States Bureau of Land Management.

There are two primary methods for capturing information on land cover: field survey and analysis of remotely sensed imagery. Land change models can be built from these types of data to assess changes in land cover over time.

One of the major land cover issues (as with all natural resource inventories) is that every survey defines similarly named categories in different ways. For instance, there are many definitions of "forest"—sometimes within the same organisation—that may or may not incorporate a number of different forest features (e.g., stand height, canopy cover, strip width, inclusion of grasses, and rates of growth for timber production). Areas without trees may be classified as forest cover "if the intention is to re-plant" (UK and Ireland), while areas with many trees may not be labelled as forest "if the trees are not growing fast enough" (Norway and Finland).

Distinction from "land use" 
"Land cover" is distinct from "land use", despite the two terms often being used interchangeably. Land use is a description of how people utilize the land and of socio-economic activity. Urban and agricultural land uses are two of the most commonly known land use classes. At any one point or place, there may be multiple and alternate land uses, the specification of which may have a political dimension. The origins of the "land cover/land use" couplet and the implications of their confusion are discussed in Fisher et al. (2005).

Types 

Following table is Land Cover statistics by Food and Agriculture Organization (FAO) with 14 classes.

Mapping 

Land cover change detection using remote sensing and geospatial data provides baseline information for assessing the climate change impacts on habitats and biodiversity, as well as natural resources, in the target areas. Land cover change detection and mapping is a key component of interdisciplinary land change science, which uses it to determine the consequences of land change on climate.

Application of land cover mapping
 Local and regional planning
 Disaster management
 Vulnerability and Risk Assessments
 Ecological management
 Monitoring the effects of climate change
 Wildlife management.
 Alternative landscape futures and conservation
 Environmental forecasting
 Environmental impact assessment
 Policy development

See also 
 Geo-Wiki
 Land change modeling
 Pedosphere
 Cryosphere
 Hydrosphere

References

Further reading 
 
 
 
 Ivan Balenovic; et al. (2015). "Quality assessment of high density digital surface model over different land cover classes".PERIODICUM BIOLOGORUM. VOL. 117, No 4, pp. 459–470, 2015

External links 
 Global land cover maps for 2015 with a spatial resolution of 100 metres based on data from the Copernicus programme
 Annual Regional Land Cover Monitoring System or Hindu Kush Himalaya with a spatial resolution of 30 metres based on Landsat images

Biogeography
Geography
Natural resources